Triangular chess is a chess variant for two players invented by George R. Dekle Sr. in 1986. The game is played on a hexagon-shaped gameboard comprising 96 triangular cells. Each player commands a full set of chess pieces in addition to three extra pawns and a unicorn.

Triangular chess and its variation tri-chess were included in World Game Review No. 10 edited by Michael Keller.

Game rules
The starting setup is as shown. As in chess, White moves first, and the object is checkmate. Other standard conventions apply as well, including castling, the pawn's initial two-step move, the en passant capture, and promotion at the last . The triangular geometry, however, implies special move patterns for the pieces.

Piece moves
 A rook moves in a straight line starting through a cell edge. (Three directions are possible.)
 A bishop moves in a straight line starting through a cell vertex. (Three directions.)
 The queen moves as a rook or bishop. (Six directions.)
 The king moves one step as a queen. When castling, the king slides two cells if  (0-0); three cells if  (0-0-0).
 A knight moves in the pattern: two steps as a bishop, then one step as a rook in an orthogonal direction. A knight leaps any intervening men.
 The unicorn moves in the pattern: two steps as a rook, then one step as a rook in an orthogonal direction. Like a knight, the unicorn leaps any intervening men.
 A pawn moves straight forward one step at a time, whether crossing a cell edge or vertex. On its first move it may optionally move two steps straight forward. A pawn captures to either cell adjoining the cell immediately in front, in the same rank.
 If a pawn reaches a board edge where no step straight forward exists, the pawn continues to advance toward promotion using its capture move (whether there are men to capture or not).

Tri-chess

Tri-chess is a variation of triangular chess created by Dekle in the same year. The game is for two players and is the same as triangular chess in all respects except the moves of the bishop, rook, queen, and king are increased.
 A bishop moves in six directions constituting board diagonals.
 A rook moves in six directions along horizontal ranks or oblique files.
 The queen moves as a rook or bishop. (Twelve directions.)
 The king moves one step as a bishop or two steps as a rook.

See also
 Also by George Dekle:
 Masonic chess
 Tri-chess – a three-player variant with triangular cells
 Trishogi – a shogi variant with triangular cells

Notes

References

Bibliography

External links
 Triangular Chess Tri-Chess simple programs by Ed Friedlander (Java)
 Triangular Chess See detailed rule descriptions, piece movements and play this variant on Omnichess 

Chess variants
1986 in chess
Board games introduced in 1986